Trouard is a French surname. Notable people with the surname include:

 Andy Trouard (born 1994), American runner
 Louis-François Trouard (1729–1804), French architect 
 Raymond Trouard (1916–2008), French pianist 

French-language surnames